P. insignis  may refer to:
 Pachylemur insignis, an extinct lemur speciesonly known from subfossil remains found at sites in central and southwestern Madagascar
 Panterpe insignis, the fiery-throated hummingbird, a medium-sized hummingbird species found in Costa Rica and western Panama
 Patelloida insignis, a sea snail species
 Philonectria insignis, a fungus species
 Platonia insignis, a plant species found in South America
 Ploceus insignis, the brown-capped weaver, a bird species found in Africa
 Polihierax insignis, the white-rumped falcon or white-rumped Pygmy-falcon, a bird of prey species found in Cambodia, Laos, Myanmar, Thailand and Vietnam
 Pothos insignis, flowering plant species in the genus Pothos
 Protomelas insignis, the one-and-a-half-stripe hap, a fish species found in Malawi, Mozambique and Tanzania
 Pselliophora insignis, a crane fly species in the genus Pselliophora

Synonyms
 Pimelodus insignis, a synonym for Pinirampus pirinampu, the flatwhiskered catfish, a catfish species found in Brazil
 Pseudophoenix insignis, a synonym for Pseudophoenix vinifera, a palm species